Crimea in the five years after the Russian Revolution had a large number of governments culminating in being a stronghold of anti-Communist forces and the place on Russian soil where they made their last stand.

Following the Russian Revolution of 1917, the military and political situation in Crimea was chaotic like that in much of Russia. During the ensuing Russian Civil War, Crimea changed hands numerous times and was for a time a stronghold of the anti-Bolshevik White Army. It was in Crimea that the White Russians led by General Wrangel made their last stand against Nestor Makhno and the Red Army in 1920. When resistance was crushed, many of the anti-Bolshevik fighters and civilians escaped by ship to Istanbul.

Approximately 50,000 White prisoners of war and civilians were summarily executed by shooting or hanging after the defeat of General Wrangel at the end of 1920. This is considered one of the largest massacres in the Civil War.
 Between 56,000 and 150,000 of the Whites were murdered as part of the Red Terror, organized by Béla Kun.

Crimea changed hands several times over the course of the conflict and several political entities were set up on the peninsula. These included:

References